is a Japanese five-time national table tennis champion.

She competed at the 2008 Summer Olympics, reaching the third round of the singles competition. She also competed in the team competition, reaching the bronze medal final but losing to South Korea.

At the 2012 London Olympics Women's Team Event semi-finals, she helped Japan overcome Singapore to reach their historic first final by winning her doubles match with Kasumi Ishikawa over Wang Yuegu and Li Jiawei (11-3, 13-11 and 11–4). Japan failed to beat China in the final, but won the first ever silver medal for their country in table tennis.

In March 2016, it was announced that she would be retiring after the Japanese Table Tennis League Big Tournament in April. She was beaten in the first round by Yuko Fujii and after the match, she said, "I feel I’ve done everything, I might have wanted to play a little better match. I’ve gone into each match thinking as if it were the last, and managed to end without any regrets".

After her retirement as a professional table tennis player, she has become a familiar face in Japanese households as a TV presenter and table tennis sportscaster. She is also an adviser for table tennis club MIKI House.

Career records
Singles (as of 10 October 2015)
Olympics: round of 32 (2008).
World Championships: round of 16 (2011).
World Cup appearances: 4. Record: 5-8th (2014).
Pro Tour winner (5): Serbian Open 2006; German Open 2009; India Open 2010; Spanish Open 2011; Belorussian Open 2014. Runner-up (4): Chile Open 2007; Japan Open 2009; Morocco Open 2011; Spanish Open 2015.
Pro Tour Grand Finals appearances: 6. Record: QF (2009, 2014).
Asian Games: QF (2010).
Asian Championships: Round of 16 (2003, 05, 07, 09).
Asian Cup: 6th (2004).

Women's doubles
World Championships: QF (2009).
Pro Tour winner (4): Polish Open 2006; Austrian Open 2007; Japan Open 2009; Egypt Open 2010; Chile Open 2010; Russia 2014. Runner-up (5): Brazil, Chile, Serbian Open 2006; China (Shenzhen), Swedish Open 2007; Moroccan Open 2011.
Pro Tour Grand Finals appearances: 3. Record: QF (2006, 07, 09).
Asian Championships: QF (2007, 09).

Mixed doubles
World Championships: round of 16 (2009, 15).

Team
Olympics: 2nd (2012).
World Championships: 2nd (2014).
World Team Cup: 3rd (2009).

References

1985 births
Living people
Japanese female table tennis players
Table tennis players at the 2008 Summer Olympics
Table tennis players at the 2012 Summer Olympics
Olympic table tennis players of Japan
Olympic medalists in table tennis
Olympic silver medalists for Japan
Medalists at the 2012 Summer Olympics
Asian Games medalists in table tennis
Table tennis players at the 2010 Asian Games
Table tennis players at the 2014 Asian Games
Medalists at the 2014 Asian Games
Asian Games silver medalists for Japan
21st-century Japanese women